The Cathedral Church of St Flannan, Killaloe is a cathedral of the Church of Ireland in Killaloe, County Clare in Ireland.

Previously the cathedral of the Diocese of Killaloe, it is now one of three cathedrals in the United Dioceses of Limerick and Killaloe. The Dean of the Cathedral is the Very Reverend Roderick Lindsay Smyth who is also Dean of Clonfert, Dean of Kilfenora and both Dean and Provost of Kilmacduagh

Architecture
Killaloe Cathedral dates from the transition between the Romanesque and Gothic periods. The front is decorated with arabesque ornaments. On the north side of the cathedral is a small oratory or chapel of a date far prior to the cathedral; and probably the original sanctuary of the holy man who founded the abbey. Its roof is very deep, and made entirely of stone; it has a belfry, and two doorways to the east and west.

In the bell tower is a chime of eight bells cast by Matthew O'Byrne of Dublin in 1896. The heaviest bell weighs just over 500 kilograms.

Recent restoration
A £200,000 restoration project involving the repair of a Romanesque doorway and the reconstruction of a 12th-century high cross, was completed in 2001. The Kilfenora Cross, embedded in the walls of the Gothic cathedral in the 1930s, is once again free-standing. The imposing 12-ft monument is now in the nave of the building.

Burials
 John Rider (bishop)

Gallery

See also
 Dean of Killaloe and Clonfert
 Ennis Cathedral

References

Diocese of Limerick and Killaloe
Anglican cathedrals in the Republic of Ireland
National Monuments in County Clare
Killaloe
Pre-Reformation Roman Catholic cathedrals